Curlew Lake is a census-designated place (CDP) in Ferry County, Washington.

Demographics
In 2010, it had a population of 462. 228 are male, 234 are female.

Geography
Curlew Lake is located in northwestern Ferry County at coordinates 48°43′49″N 118°39′58″W. The community includes all of Curlew Lake, a  water body at the head of Curlew Creek, as well as land on all sides of the lake, bounded to the east by Washington State Route 21, to the south by West Herron Creek Road, and to the west and north by West Curlew Lake Road. The CDP contains the unincorporated community of Pollard, located on the west side of the lake. Curlew State Park is on the east side of the lake, directly across from Pollard.

The lake drains to the north via Curlew Creek, a tributary of the Kettle River, which flows north, then east, then south to the Columbia River near Kettle Falls, Washington.

References

Census-designated places in Ferry County, Washington